Jylian Gustlin is a San Francisco Bay Area painter in a contemporary redefinition of the 1960s—70s San Francisco Bay Area Figurative artists, their styles and techniques. Although using traditional painterly techniques, her vibrant paintings explore the impact of new technologies on perception. Inspired by a lifelong love of the San Francisco Bay Area Figurative artists, mathematical theories such as the Fibonacci sequence, the resonant tones of Latin phrases, African masks, and antique Roman vessels, Jylian's Gustlin's work is a modern hybrid between the past and the present.

The noted activist, singer and friend of Gustlin, Joan Baez wrote,

“I am fortunate enough to have Jylian as a friend. I know her as exuberant, open, fun, funny, teasing, stubborn to the point of bullheadedness, and as a splendidly free spirit. She has psychic tendencies, drives like a maniac, and runs in the hills for hours on end, fair weather and foul. It is that same energy which directs her hands and body to paint. My guess is the actual painting is executed in the same trance she experiences as a runner. The results are expansive, like the hills, with the colors instinctively finding their place in the grand picture. She creates what I believe is “fine art.” She has been present to help me, a beginner, find ways to hurdle over stuck points, and struggle with her suggestion to “make as many mistakes as you can.”If that is the same as “take as many risks as you can,” it blends like a perfect palette with the rest of her life style, and the viewer is the beneficiary of the whole package.”

Life and education 

Gustlin is a native Californian and grew up in the Bay Area. She has been shaped by the technology explosion of Silicon Valley, and her art reflects her in-depth knowledge of technology. She studied mathematics and computer science at San José State University and received a BFA from the Art Academy of San Francisco where technology was emerging as an art medium. Combining her understanding of computers and her love for art, she became a graphics programmer and art director for Apple Inc.

When you add art, you add design, and design makes science, technology, and mathematics, beautiful. Exploring these subjects and their intersection with design inspires new ideas for Gustlin. When she is painting, it is with impassioned emotions, allowing her personal experiences to flow through the paintbrush directly on to the canvas. This extension beyond mathematics and science is the creative language of art. "While painting in acrylic and oil paints, her artwork often conveys the same complex layered effects possible in computer programs" 

Working at a large technology company gave Gustlin an unusual understanding of how patterns and layers on a computer screen might be reflected in actual paint layers. During the last twenty years as a full-time artist, she has designed and drawn many of her preliminary concepts on the computer. Technology today is very advanced, allowing paint and drawings to merge with precision, creating complex layered effects when using different computer programs. In addition to two-dimensional design, Gustlin uses three-dimensional modeling texture programs to produce character and movement of the figure through animation. With her software skills, glitch (the use of digital errors to manipulate digital information) and data visualization software, she creates new directions and accidental meetings of shapes, forms, and color.

Art work

Figurative paintings 

Figurative paintings have been Gustlin's love for her entire life. As a child, she drew paper dolls and their colorful clothes for herself and her friends; dolls in endless combinations and colors. While consistently drawing figures, she explored the human body—the choreography of the limbs and body in a fluid motion. Today, she uses the colors to create emotions on the abstracted figures, leaving the interpretation of the painting to the viewer.

Figurative work is the interpretation and illusion of a figure painted on a board or canvas. We must ponder to what extent our identity is formed by external constraints and the situations by those around us before painting can commence. Within many layers and textures, Gustlin questions, “How do we shape who we are? How do we construct our individual and societal identities? And how do we transform our anonymous lives into a moment where we are living in harmony?”

In Gustlin's paintings, the human body emerges from the background and moves through our emotions. The rich patterns of shapes and colors bring the figures to life and challenges our imagination. The layers of paint and interwoven color is the beauty and explosive atmosphere Gustlin brings to the human body. The moody, yet qualitative, emotions are expressed in her paintings as they emerge into the foreground, bringing the complex, layered textures of the figure into our space as we sense its presence and feelings.

Gustlin's abstracted figures present non-verbal language, leaving the viewer to experience the painting, gathering their own information. The etymology of figurative painting is gathered through body language. The gestures of the form or expressions of the face convey meaning, emotions, and thoughts. With abstracted figures, it is up to the viewer to define the meaning of the space. "The figurative characters are frequently set in an alien-like landscape, temperamental and ominous, yet simultaneously depicting a sense of future self reflection." If a face is put on the body, people are drawn more to the face, instead, Gustlin wants the viewer to pull back and view more of what is happening with the body in the space of the canvas. The same can be said about the seemingly nude figure because clothing ties a figure to a style or specific time-period. The body poses are meant to be thought thought-provoking and inspirational, creating different viewer experiences. “Gustlin continues to amaze us with her strength in a variety of subject matter. Very rarely is an artist accomplished in both figurative and abstract styles — and as well regarded for tackling both.”

Gustlin's figures are created with overly exaggerated long legs. The feet are large because she believes it grounds the figures to the earth, like a tree growing long and tall, but always with roots attached to the ground. The stances represent the stories we carry in our body and let the viewer interpret the movement in the painting. "The sketchy quality of her figures and heavy drips of pigment allows the viewer to better experience the hand of this artist, as she attacks her surfaces with a savvy guilelessness and assured fluidity." The colors in her work come from the palate of nature. The hours she spends trail running in the mountains gives her inspiration from the colors of wildflowers, hillsides, redwood trees jutting into the blue skies, and the deep blues of the shadows.

Fibonacci 

Gustlin is shaped by technology at her fingertips and her art reflects the in-depth knowledge of technological manipulation. Figures have always been an important part and the foundation of her art; however, she also creates abstract paintings with Fibonacci sequence numbers producing complex and layered paintings.

Fibonacci calculations create rectangles and shell spirals based on incrementally increasing numbers, and she exploits the relationship of Fibonacci numbers and combines circles in Fibonacci patterns to produce paintings. The characteristics of mathematical entropy are the basis for many of her abstract works.

Approaching the figures from a mathematical and an emotional perspective, she incorporates the golden ratio, giving the finished piece the dynamic purity of expression. Perhaps a clearer way of explaining this would be: ‘Discovered by Pythagoras, the golden ratio is when a line is divided into two parts so that the whole length divided by the long part is also equal to the long part divided by the short part.’ The golden ratio is a line that becomes divided so that the entire line has the same ratio to the smaller segment. Pattern recognition can be very useful in paintings and can even represent mystical or profound numbers in a painting.

She explores the relationship of Fibonacci numbers and how it intersects with the arts in every new design. However, when painting, free expression and personal experiences flow through the paintbrush and directly onto the canvas. This extension beyond mathematics and science is the creative language of art. "An especially intriguing [Fibonacci] piece by the San Francisco Bay Area's acclaimed computer-programmer-turned artist, Jylian Gustlin, is layered with hundreds of paints, archival and metallic papers, and other mixed media, the image is based on shapes created by the ascending mathematical pattern known as the Fibonacci sequence. This piece stands as solid proof to the kids that math really can be used after they graduate!"

Entropy 

The “Entropy” series began as she was exploring different types of mathematical equations and was heavily influenced by the word entropy, the literal meaning of which is: “life flows from low to high.”. While trail running, she observes the chaos in the forest and creates designs in the emotional landscapes of her mind. In her studio, she uses that chaos of ideas and the reality of the landscape in the adaptions of her entropy paintings. "Just as she challenged the creative limitations of the latest computer software, Gustlin experiments with a variety of materials to discover their effects. Working with two-part epoxy resin, oil and acrylic paints, charcoal, wax, gold leaf, pastel and graphite on board, Gustlin draws, paints, scratches on her surfaces."

Entropy is used to describe how things in nature generally change from an orderly system to a changed or more disordered system. If the water is poured from a pitcher or glass on to a table, the water cannot reverse itself and return to its original state. The water also has a changed appearance from contained in within the pitcher in a cylindrical look to a large flat position, even forming small droplets as it continues to spread itself. The amount of water does not decrease but it changes its appearance. Temperature can change the way the water appears as it boils over on to the surface or becomes steam and rises into the air. The chaos ensued after change is the entropy.

The disorder can take multiple forms and visually change the experience of the change. An artist can squeeze paint from a tube, and it forms a spot on the canvas. If a brush is run through the paint, the paint spreads and is intense in color in some places on the canvas and minimized on in other places. When water is added to the paint, the paint expands across the canvas and becomes lighter in color. With all of the uses of the paint, the paint can never be returned to the original system—the tube. All aspects have changed the paint into a disordered or changed system.

"With her background in computer science and mathematics, she has a heightened understanding of how studying patterns and layers on the computer screen helps her to lay down the bones of a painting while remaining loose enough to maintain an organic and painterly presence".

Entropy meets up with time and it would not surprise anyone if at the end of the day Gustlin's studio was a mess, and if she left the mess at night and cleaned it the next day, the studio would have a different configuration. This is entropy, the growth of chaos and with an order of change coming out of that chaos. The series explores nature; the ever-changing environment from calm to chaos in a moment. The “Fibonacci” series explores the structure of the world through mathematics—the calculated sequence of events. When uniting the figurative, “Fibonacci” and “Entropy” series, they become intertwined as she applies paints, colors, and lines. Gustlin perceives the world as interconnected and seamlessly designed, providing her ideas for the three series.

Exhibitions and collections 
Jylian Gustlin's work has been shown in multiple solo and group exhibitions in New York, Boston, San Francisco, Seattle, Colorado, San Diego, Hawaii, and British Columbia as well as others

She was featured, along with quilts from Gee's Bend in the San Juan Islands Museum show: Conversations with Gee's Bend (2018). Gustlin was sponsored by Adobe corporations for her work in Heart of San Francisco (2004), creating one of the large sculpture hearts found around the city of San Francisco.

 Stratera, Gallery Mar, Park City, CO, 2018
 Jylian New Works, Canfin Gallery, Tarry Town, NY, 2016
 Multiplicity, Jules Place Gallery, Boston, MA, 2015
 Jylian, Canfin Gallery, Tarry Town, NY, 2013
 Group Exhibition, Forre Fine Art Gallery, Aspen, CO 2012
 Humanity, Brett Wesley Gallery, Las Vegas, NV, 2011
 Caper, Jest, Revel & Stomp, SOPA Fine Arts, Kelowna BC, 2011
 Females on Figure, Madison Gallery, La Jolla, CA, 2011
 Luscious Visions, Jules Place Gallery, Boston, MA, 2010>
 Fibonacci, Oracle, San Francisco, CA, 2008
 Gifted, SOPA Fine Arts, Kelowna BC, 2007
 Aeris, HANG, San Francisco, CA, 2007
 Two Woman Show, Stricoff Gallery, NY, 2007
 MC2 Collection, San Francisco, CA, 2003
 Francisco Partners Collection, San Francisco, CA 2001 – 2004
 Sunset Magazine Idea House, Palo Alto, CA 2002
 Big Deal Visual Aid, San Francisco, CA annually 1992 – 2003
 Group Exhibition Adobe Corporation Gallery, San Jose, CA 1997

Gustlin's work is in the collections of Saatchi Stanford Medical Center (California), Norges Geotenkniske Institutt (Norway), Visa Headquarters (San Francisco), Oracle Headquarters (California), MERE Hotel (Canada), Gaslamp Hilton Suites (San Diego), Wyndham Orlando Resort (Florida), Morgan Hill Library (California), Spaulding Hospital (Massachusetts), Eilan Hotel and Spa (Texas), and One Empire Pass (Utah).

She is represented by several galleries including Gallery Mar in Park City and Carmel and Canfin Gallery in New York.

References

External links 
 

American painters
American women painters
Academy of Art University alumni
Year of birth missing (living people)
Living people
21st-century American women